Mountain High School may refer to:

 Mountain High School (Mountain, Wisconsin), in Mountain, Wisconsin, US
 Mountain High School, an alternative school in Rim of the World Unified School District, California, US
 Mountain High School, a special school in Davis School District, Utah, US
 Mountain High School, former name of West Orange High School (New Jersey), US

See also
 Mountain View High School (disambiguation)
 Rocky Mountain High School (disambiguation)